The Terra Cotta Invitational is an annual amateur golf tournament. It has been played since 1996 at Naples National Golf Club in Naples, Florida.

It is a "category B" tournament in the World Amateur Golf Ranking, meaning it is one of the top 100 men's amateur tournaments in the world.

Winners

2022 Caleb Surratt
2021 Caleb Surratt
2020 Canceled
2019 Alex Vogelsong
2018 Fernando Barco
2017 Chris Nido
2016 Tony Gil
2015 Jorge García
2014 Davis Riley
2013 Nathan Kimsey
2012 Donald Constable
2011 Emiliano Grillo
2010 Justin Thomas
2009 Matt Ceravolo
2008 Bud Cauley
2007 Peter Uihlein
2006 Arnond Vongvanij
2005 Tommy Brennan
2004 Danny Green
2003 Casey Wittenberg
2002 John Harris
2001 Tom McKnight
2000 Danny Green
1999 Sean Knapp
1998 Gene Elliott
1997 Matt Kuchar
1996 Jerry Courville Jr.

References

External links
Official site
List of winners

Amateur golf tournaments in the United States
Golf in Florida
Recurring sporting events established in 1996